The IUPUI Public Art Collection, located in Indianapolis, Indiana, United States, consists of more than 30 works of sculpture located outdoors on the campus of Indiana University–Purdue University Indianapolis. IUPUI is a public shared campus of Indiana University and Purdue University that was created in 1969. More than 30,000 students attend IUPUI today and view the sculptures as they walk, bicycle and drive around the campus.

Especially notable sculptures in the collection include James Wille Faust's The Herron Arch 1 (2005), the Peirce Geodetic Monument (1987) and Steve Wooldridge's Zephyr (1998). Additional sculptures are located on private property adjacent to IUPUI, including the Indiana Avenue cultural district, Riley Hospital and the J. F. Miller Foundation. IUPUI also holds a collection of art works located indoors, including Dale Chihuly’s DNA Tower (2003).

Campus 
Public art is distributed throughout the 509-acre IUPUI campus. Sculptures are clustered near the Herron School of Art and Design, the School of Liberal Arts, and the University Library. Several were previously displayed at the White River State Park or Indianapolis Museum of Art.

The campus is next to the Indiana Avenue cultural district, just west of downtown Indianapolis near the Indianapolis Zoo, Downtown Canal Walk, and White River State Park.

A large collection of archival photographs of the campus can be found in the IUPUI Image Collection. Ralph D. Gray's book IUPUI—the Making of an Urban University (Bloomington: Indiana University Press, 2003) is a comprehensive account of the history of the campus.

Significant works 
In 2009, the IUPUI Public Art Collection added four new sculptures lent by the Indianapolis Museum of Art: Sasson Soffer’s East Gate/West Gate (1973), Will Horwitt’s Spaces with Iron (1972), Shan Zou Zhou’s Portrait of History (1997) and John Francis Torreano’s Mega-Gem (1989).

Alumni, students and faculty also have work included in the collection. For example, Don Gummer’s Reunion (1992), Casey Eskridge’s Torso Fragment (2005), and Eric Nordgulen’s Antenna Man (1998) and Anatomy Vessel (Saplings) (2003–2005). Only two works by women artists are included in the permanent IUPUI Public Art Collection: Judith Shea’s Job (2005) and Jill Viney’s Barrow (2007–2008)

Administration 
Public art on campus is managed by the Curator of Campus Art, Sherry Rouse, through the Office of Risk Management at IU Bloomington. Each IU campus has a Campus Art Committee whose members work with Rouse. A system-wide “Public Art Policy” was adopted in 1999 to govern work by the Curator of Campus Art and IUPUI Campus Art Committee. The Indiana University Board of Trustees regularly reviews and approves proposals to site public art works on campus.

Documentation 
The Curator of Campus Art maintains a computerized database of public art on campus, including acquisition and loan information and digital photographs. In addition, a Fall 2009 Museum Studies course at IUPUI undertook the project of researching and reporting on the condition of outdoor sculptures on campus.  The IUPUI artworks were the first group to be documented through the WikiProject, Wikipedia Saves Public Art.

This effort was influenced by the successful Save Outdoor Sculpture! 1989 campaign organized by Heritage Preservation: The National Institute of Conservation partnered with the Smithsonian Institution, specifically the Smithsonian American Art Museum. Throughout the 1990s, over 7,000 volunteers nationwide cataloged and assessed the condition of over 30,000 publicly accessible statues, monuments, and sculptures installed as outdoor public art across the United States.

See also
Indiana Statehouse Public Art Collection
Eskenazi Health Art Collection

References

External links
IUPUI Public Art Collection Group Flickr Pool
IUPUI Web page
Wikipedia Saves Public Art 2009: A Survey of IUPUI Public Art.

 
Culture of Indianapolis
Outdoor sculptures in Indianapolis